Sophia Hutchins is an American businesswoman, television personality, and socialite. She is the founder and chief executive officer of the sunscreen company LUMASOL. Hutchins is also Caitlyn Jenner's manager and the former chief executive officer of the Caitlyn Jenner Foundation.

Career 
Hutchins is the founder and chief executive officer of LUMASOL, a company that makes sunscreen mist. She previously worked as the chief executive officer and director of the Caitlyn Jenner Foundation, an organization that promotes LGBTQ equality and provides grants to organizations that help transgender people.

Hutchins met Caitlyn Jenner in 2015 and appeared in multiple episodes of the television documentary series I Am Cait. Hutchins works as Jenner's manager.

In 2020, Hutchins attempted to become a cast member of The Real Housewives of Beverly Hills, but ultimately was not cast in the show.

Personal life 
Hutchins graduated from Pepperdine University in 2019 with a degree in economics and finance. Hutchins is a transgender woman, and came out during college.

She lives in Malibu with Caitlyn Jenner. In 2019, Hutchins was interviewed by Piers Morgan for Good Morning Britain. She posted on social media later that Morgan asked her inappropriate questions regarding her relationship with Caitlyn Jenner. Hutchins also responded to multiple tabloids that ran articles falsely claiming that she and Jenner were engaged or dating.

References 

Living people
Year of birth missing (living people)
21st-century American businesspeople
21st-century American businesswomen
American socialites
American women television personalities
American women chief executives
LGBT businesspeople
Participants in American reality television series
Pepperdine University alumni
Transgender women